Welcome to Waikiki 2 is a 2019 South Korean television series starring Lee Yi-kyung, Kim Seon-ho, Shin Hyun-soo, Moon Ga-young, Ahn So-hee and Kim Ye-won. It is the sequel to the 2018 series Welcome to Waikiki. It aired on JTBC's Mondays and Tuesdays at 21:30 (KST) time slot from March 25 to May 14, 2019.

Synopsis
Now successful in their respective fields, the previous owners of Waikiki have left with the exception of Lee Joon-ki. While struggling with his career, he tries to revive the guest house amidst a bankruptcy along with the help of high-school friends, Cha Woo-sik and Kook Ki-bong.

Cast

Main
 Lee Yi-kyung as Lee Joon-ki 
CEO of the Waikiki Guesthouse. He dreams of becoming a famous actor.
 Kim Seon-ho as Cha Woo-sik 
Joon-ki's high school friend who invested in the Waikiki Guesthouse. He dreams of becoming a musician.
 Shin Hyun-soo as Kook Ki-bong  
Joon-ki's high school friend who invested in the Waikiki Guesthouse. He dreams of becoming a baseball player.
 Moon Ga-young as Han Soo-yeon 
Joon-ki, Woo-sik and Ki-bong's first love. After her wedding is called off, she has to learn how to earn money for herself.
 Ahn So-hee as Kim Jeong-eun 
Joon-ki's university friend who dreams of becoming an actress. In the meantime, she does part-time jobs. She falls for Joon-ki.
 Kim Ye-won as Cha Yoo-ri 
Woo-sik's elder sister. She's manipulative and knows how to use others' weaknesses to get what she wants. Dreams of having her own restaurant, she later falls in love with Ki-bong.

Supporting
 Jeon Soo-kyeong as owner of Waikiki Guesthouse (Ep. 1–2, 16)
 Song Young-jae as baseball team's coach
 Jung Eun-woo as Min-seok, Soo-yeon's ex-fiancée (Ep. 1–2)
 Jung In-gi as Soo-yeon's father (Ep. 1–2, 16)

Special appearances
 Lee Jun-hyeok as director with amnesia (Ep. 1)
 Kim Hyeong-beom as director (Ep. 2)
 Kim Young-dae as Kook Ki-bong's successful baseball junior at the baseball academy (Ep. 2)
 Joo Sang-wook as Kang Min-ho, top star (Ep. 2)
 Jung Man-sik as lender (Ep. 2)
 Oh Na-ra as lender's wife (Ep. 2)
 Moon Hee-kyung as Min-seok's mother (Ep. 2)
 Lee Si-eon as producer (Ep. 3)
 Lee Jung-eun as Kimbap Heavenly owner (Ep. 3)
 Kim Young-woong as zookeeper (Ep. 3)
 Im Kang-sung as Yu-min, top star (Ep. 4)
 Byeon Woo-seok as Yoon Seo-jun (Ep. 4)
 Park Ah-in as Da-young (Ep. 5)
 In Gyo-jin as Kwak Ha-ni (Ep. 5)
 Kim Yeon-woo as Woo-sik's senior (Ep. 6)
 Shim Hyung-tak as Byeong-cheol sunbae (Gi-bong's senior in baseball academy) (Ep. 6–7)
 Kim Ki-cheon as a beggar (Ep. 7)
 Shin Hyun-jong as protester (Ep. 7)
 Oh Hee-joon as a pervert (Ep. 7)
 Yoon Ji-won as Waikiki guest (Ep. 7)
 Kim Kwang-sik as Park Yong-pal, gangster boss (Ep. 8)
 Lee Hee-jin as Kang Mi-young, boss's wife (Ep. 8)
 Heo Tae-hee as Sang-woo, news anchor (Ep. 8–9)
 Kim Jong-pal as Park Cho-rong, a sheep-rancher (Ep. 9)
 Kim Joo-ryoung as speech teacher (Ep. 9)
 Kim Il-jung as quiz show host (Ep. 10)
 Yang Joo-ho as Waikiki guest (Ep. 10)
 Yeom Dong-heon as Jang Jun-hyeok (Ep. 11)
 Yoon Hee-seok (Ep. 12)
 Bang Jun-ho (Ep. 12)

Production
 One of the female lead roles was offered to Kang Han-na, but she declined.
 Kim Jung-hyun, who starred in the first season, declined an offer to return.
 Lee Yi-kyung is the only lead actor from the original series who reprised in role in the second season.
 The first script reading took place on January 21, 2019, at JTBC Building in Sangam, Seoul, South Korea.

Original soundtrack

Part 1

Part 2

Part 3

Part 4

Part 5

Part 6

Part 7

Ratings

Notes

References

External links
  
 
 

Korean-language television shows
JTBC television dramas
2019 South Korean television series debuts
2019 South Korean television series endings
South Korean comedy television series
Television series by C-JeS Entertainment
Sequel television series
Television series by Drama House